Japan Expo is a convention on Japanese popular culture - the largest of its kind in the world - taking place in Paris, France, although it has branched out into a partnership festival - Kultima - and expanded to include some European and US pop culture as well. It is held yearly at the beginning of July for four days (usually from Thursday to Sunday) in the Paris-Nord Villepinte Exhibition Center (the second-largest convention center in France). The attendance has increased steadily over the years, with 2,400 visitors welcomed in the first edition in 1999 and more than 252,510 for the 2019 edition.

As with the Olympic Games and many other mass gatherings, the 2020 edition was canceled because of the global COVID‑19 pandemic.

History

The first exposition took place in 1999 at the ISC Paris Business School and welcomed 2,400 visitors, a number which has grown steadily. In 2002, Japan Expo was hosted at the Center of New Industries and Technologies (CNIT) in La Défense, Paris.

In 2005, the event was canceled out of security concerns due to the large number of visitors. The exposition has since moved to the larger Exhibition Centre in Paris-Nord Villepinte.

In 2020, the event was postponed to 2021 due to concerns of the COVID-19 pandemic.

Event history

Japan Expo in other cities
Other than the main convention in Paris, Japan Expo has expanded to 4 cities in 3 countries on 2 continents:

Japan Expo Centre in Orléans
Japan Expo Sud in Marseille
Chibi Japan Expo in Montreuil

Japan Expo Belgium in Brussels

Japan Expo USA in Santa Clara, California

References

External links

 
Chibi Japan Expo - Smaller version in November

Japanese culture
Anime conventions
Recurring events established in 1999
1999 establishments in France
Exhibitions in France
Annual events in Paris